The 2023 Champion Hurdle was a horse race held at Cheltenham Racecourse on Tuesday 14 March 2023. It was the 93rd running of the Champion Hurdle.

The race was won by 4/11 favourite Constitution Hill, ridden by Nico de Boinville and trained by Nicky Henderson.

Race details
 Sponsor: Unibet
 Purse: 
 Going:Soft
 Distance:2 miles 87 yards
 Number of runners: 7
 Winner's time: 3:59.38

References

External links
2023 Champion Hurdle at the Racing Post

2023 in horse racing
2023
2023 in British sport
2023 Champion Hurdle
March 2023 sports events in the United Kingdom